Shoqarij-e Sofla (also Romanized as Shoqārīj-e Soflá; also known as Marzūk, Shagharich Sofla, Shaghārīj-e Pā’īn, Shoghārīj-e Pā’īn, Shoghārīj-e Soflā, and Shoghārīj-e Soflá) is a village in Miyan Ab Rural District, in the Central District of Shushtar County, Khuzestan Province, Iran. At the 2006 census, its population was 169, in 28 families.

References 

Populated places in Shushtar County